Şenay is a feminine Turkish given name. Notable people with the name include:
 Şenay Gürler (born 1966), Turkish actress
 Şenay Yüzbaşıoğlu (1951-2013), Turkish singer, aka Şenay

Turkish feminine given names